A Writer's Life is a 2006 autobiography by Gay Talese.  The book focuses on many of the stories that Talese attempted to tell, but failed, such as spending six months working on a story about John and Lorena Bobbitt for The New Yorker only to have the piece rejected by New Yorker editor Tina Brown.

Bibliography

References

2006 non-fiction books
Works by Gay Talese
Literary autobiographies
Alfred A. Knopf books